Englishtown is a borough in Monmouth County, in the U.S. state of New Jersey. The community is nestled within the Raritan Valley region. As of the 2010 United States census, the borough's population was 1,847, reflecting an increase of 83 (+4.7%) from the 1,764 counted in the 2000 Census, which had in turn increased by 496 (+39.1%) from the 1,268 counted in the 1990 Census.

Englishtown was incorporated as a borough by an act of the New Jersey Legislature on January 4, 1888, from portions of Manalapan Township, based on the results of a referendum held the previous day. The borough was named for James English, an early settler.

History

At the Battle of Monmouth, an American Revolutionary War battle fought on June 28, 1778 in Monmouth County, American General Charles Lee led the advance and initiated the first attack on the column's rear. When the British turned to flank him, he ordered a general retreat without as much as firing a shot at the enemy, and his soldiers soon became disorganized. General George Washington continued the battle, earning respect for the Continental Army troops under his command. In the dining room of the Village Inn, located in the center of Englishtown, General Washington and Lord Stirling drew up the court martial papers citing Lee for his conduct during and after the battle.

Geography
According to the United States Census Bureau, the borough had a total area of 0.59 square miles (1.52 km2), including 0.57 square miles (1.48 km2) of land and 0.02 square miles (0.04 km2) of water (2.88%).

The borough is entirely surrounded by Manalapan Township, making it part of 21 pairs of "doughnut towns" in the state, where one municipality entirely surrounds another.

Demographics

Census 2010

The Census Bureau's 2006–2010 American Community Survey showed that (in 2010 inflation-adjusted dollars) median household income was $70,795 (with a margin of error of +/− $8,336) and the median family income was $86,484 (+/− $8,333). Males had a median income of $65,625 (+/− $10,588) versus $43,333 (+/− $8,417) for females. The per capita income for the borough was $30,313 (+/− $2,456). About 1.5% of families and 2.3% of the population were below the poverty line, including 4.1% of those under age 18 and 5.4% of those age 65 or over.

Census 2000

As of the 2000 United States Census there were 1,764 people, 643 households, and 416 families residing in the borough. The population density was 3,102.1 people per square mile (1,194.9/km2). There were 680 housing units at an average density of 1,195.8 per square mile (460.6/km2). The racial makeup of the borough was 88.38% White, 4.14% African American, .11% Native American, 4.48% Asian, 1.64% from other races, and 1.25% from two or more races. Hispanic or Latino of any race were 6.24% of the population.

There were 643 households, out of which 39.5% had children under the age of 18 living with them, 51.8% were married couples living together, 10.0% had a female householder with no husband present, and 35.3% were non-families. 28.5% of all households were made up of individuals, and 14.3% had someone living alone who was 65 years of age or older. The average household size was 2.74 and the average family size was 3.51.

In the borough the population was spread out, with 29.1% under the age of 18, 6.0% from 18 to 24, 36.5% from 25 to 44, 17.5% from 45 to 64, and 11% who were 65 years of age or older. The median age was 35 years. For every 100 females, there were 91.5 males. For every 100 females age 18 and over, there were 82.4 males.

The median income for a household in the borough was $57,557, and the median income for a family was $73,750. Males had a median income of $50,694 versus $33,068 for females. The per capita income for the borough was $23,438. About 4% of families and 7.2% of the population were below the poverty line, including 5.7% of those under age 18 and 13.4% of those age 65 or over.

Government

Local government
Englishtown is governed under the Borough form of New Jersey municipal government, which is used in 218 municipalities (of the 564) statewide, making it the most common form of government in New Jersey. The governing body is comprised of the Mayor and the Borough Council, with all positions elected at-large on a partisan basis as part of the November general election. The Mayor is elected directly by the voters to a four-year term of office. The Borough Council is comprised of six members elected to serve three-year terms on a staggered basis, with two seats coming up for election each year in a three-year cycle. The Borough form of government used by Englishtown is a "weak mayor / strong council" government in which council members act as the legislative body with the mayor presiding at meetings and voting only in the event of a tie. The mayor can veto ordinances subject to an override by a two-thirds majority vote of the council. The mayor makes committee and liaison assignments for council members, and most appointments are made by the mayor with the advice and consent of the council.

, the Mayor of the Borough of Englishtown is Republican Thomas Reynolds, whose term of office ends December 31, 2023. Members of the Englishtown Borough Council are Daniel Francisco (R, 2024), Eric L. Mann (R, 2023), Wliiam L. Lewis Jr. (R, 2024), Dan Marter (R, 2022), Cecilia "Cindy" Robilotti (R, 2023) and Gregory W. Wojyn (R, 2022).

In March 2020, Daniel Francisco was chosen to fill the seat expiring in December 2021 that had been held by Lori Cooke until her seat was declared to be vacant after she had missed three consecutive unexcused absences from council meetings.

In April 2016, the Borough Council selected Eric Mann from three candidates nominated by the Republican municipal committee to fill the seat expiring December 2017 that had been held by Rudy Rucker until his resignation; Mann served on an interim basis until the November 2016 general election, when he was elected to fill the balance of the term.

On March 28, 2012, Jayne Carr's seat on the Borough Council was officially vacated in accordance with state law after she failed to appear at eight consecutive meetings of the Borough Council dating back to December 2011. Carr claimed that she had stayed away from council meetings after receiving a death threat, and had informed the Monmouth County Prosecutor regarding the incident. As of May 4, 2012, no official statement has ever been made from any law enforcement agency at the local, state, or federal level confirming Carr's claims.  In November 2011, Carr had been censured "for conduct detrimental to the orderly conduct of borough governance and violating standards of decorum and debate of a public body", based on statements that she had made accusing a council member and borough employee of breaking state law, and of having claimed to have chaired meetings of the Englishtown Development Committee.  According to official records, the meetings Carr claimed to have chaired were never held.

On April 25, 2012, the Council selected Lou Sarti, a retired police officer and long-time resident of Englishtown who had served as President of the Englishtown Fire Department, to fill the unexpired term of the vacated seat.

Federal, state, and county representation
Englishtown is located in the 3rd Congressional District and is part of New Jersey's 12th state legislative district. 

 

Monmouth County is governed by a Board of County Commissioners comprised of five members who are elected at-large to serve three year terms of office on a staggered basis, with either one or two seats up for election each year as part of the November general election. At an annual reorganization meeting held in the beginning of January, the board selects one of its members to serve as Director and another as Deputy Director. , Monmouth County's Commissioners are
Commissioner Director Thomas A. Arnone (R, Neptune City, term as commissioner and as director ends December 31, 2022), 
Commissioner Deputy Director Susan M. Kiley (R, Hazlet Township, term as commissioner ends December 31, 2024; term as deputy commissioner director ends 2022),
Lillian G. Burry (R, Colts Neck Township, 2023),
Nick DiRocco (R, Wall Township, 2022), and 
Ross F. Licitra (R, Marlboro Township, 2023). 
Constitutional officers elected on a countywide basis are
County clerk Christine Giordano Hanlon (R, 2025; Ocean Township), 
Sheriff Shaun Golden (R, 2022; Howell Township) and 
Surrogate Rosemarie D. Peters (R, 2026; Middletown Township).

Politics
As of March 23, 2011, there were a total of 1,115 registered voters in Englishtown, of which 238 (21.3%) were registered as Democrats, 252 (22.6%) were registered as Republicans and 625 (56.1%) were registered as Unaffiliated. There were no voters registered to other parties.

In the 2012 presidential election, Republican Mitt Romney received 54.3% of the vote (428 cast), ahead of Democrat Barack Obama with 44.5% (351 votes), and other candidates with 1.1% (9 votes), among the 794 ballots cast by the borough's 1,281 registered voters (6 ballots were spoiled), for a turnout of 62.0%. In the 2008 presidential election, Republican John McCain received 52.1% of the vote (411 cast), ahead of Democrat Barack Obama with 45.2% (357 votes) and other candidates with 1.0% (8 votes), among the 789 ballots cast by the borough's 1,118 registered voters, for a turnout of 70.6%. In the 2004 presidential election, Republican George W. Bush received 55.8% of the vote (387 ballots cast), outpolling Democrat John Kerry with 42.7% (296 votes) and other candidates with 0.5% (5 votes), among the 693 ballots cast by the borough's 1,010 registered voters, for a turnout percentage of 68.6.

In the 2013 gubernatorial election, Republican Chris Christie received 72.7% of the vote (320 cast), ahead of Democrat Barbara Buono with 23.6% (104 votes), and other candidates with 3.6% (16 votes), among the 443 ballots cast by the borough's 1,283 registered voters (3 ballots were spoiled), for a turnout of 34.5%. In the 2009 gubernatorial election, Republican Chris Christie received 70.2% of the vote (358 ballots cast), ahead of  Democrat Jon Corzine with 22.9% (117 votes), Independent Chris Daggett with 5.9% (30 votes) and other candidates with 0.8% (4 votes), among the 510 ballots cast by the borough's 1,083 registered voters, yielding a 47.1% turnout.

Education

Public school students in pre-kindergarten through eighth grade attend the Manalapan-Englishtown Regional School District, which also serves children from Manalapan Township. Manalapan and Englishtown formally joined together as a regional elementary school district in 1963, with an initial enrollment of 1,140 students; The student body is primarily from Manalapan Township, which accounts for about 95% of enrollment, with Englishtown students accounting for the remaining 5%. As of the 2019–2020 school year, the district, comprised of eight schools, had an enrollment of 4,910 students and 408.4 classroom teachers (on an FTE basis), for a student–teacher ratio of 12.0:1. Schools in the district (with 2019–2020 enrollment from the National Center for Education Statistics) are 
John I. Dawes Early Learning Center with 365 students in Pre-K and K, 
Clark Mills School with 491 students in grades 1–5, 
Lafayette Mills School with 489 students in grades 1–5, 
Milford Brook School with 523 students in grades K–5, 
Taylor Mills School with 600 students in grades K–5, 
Wemrock Brook School with 626 students in grades 1–5, 
Pine Brook School with 563 students in sixth grade and 
Manalapan-Englishtown Middle School with 1,227 students in grades 7 and 8. The district is overseen by a nine-member board of education, which sets policy and oversees the fiscal and educational operation of the district; Seats on the board are allocated based on population, with one seat assigned to Englishtown.

Students from Englishtown in public school for ninth through twelfth grades attend Manalapan High School as part of the Freehold Regional High School District (FRHSD). The Freehold Regional High School District also serves students from Colts Neck Township, Englishtown, Farmingdale, Freehold Borough, Freehold Township, Howell Township and Marlboro Township. As of the 2019–2020 school year, Manalapan High School had an enrollment of 1,879 students and 122.8 classroom teachers (on an FTE basis), for a student–teacher ratio of 15.3:1. Students may apply to attend one of the district's six specialized learning centers, including the Science and Engineering Learning Center hosted at Manalapan High School. The FRHSD board of education has nine members, who are elected to three-year terms from each of the constituent districts. Each member is allocated a fraction of a vote that totals to nine points, with Englishtown allocated one member, who has 0.5 votes.

Public high school students also have the option of attending one of the Monmouth County Vocational School District's five career academies.

Transportation

Roads and highways

County Route 522 and County Route 527 are the most prominent roads directly serving the borough.

Public transportation
In the 19th & 20th centuries, Englishtown Borough and Manalapan Township had a major railway in the area, which was the Freehold and Jamesburg Agricultural Railroad. This railway was owned and operated by the Camden & Amboy Railroad Company (C&A), in which surveying for the line began on September 8, 1851, grading began on October 19, 1852, and the first track was laid on April 4, 1853. The first section of line was opened on July 18, 1853. The establishment of the Freehold & Jamesburg Agricultural Railroad allowed this region to become a transportation hub. The Freehold and Jamesburg Railroad was abandoned by the early 1930s. A  portion of the former railroad's right-of-way was later approved to be sold by the New Jersey Board of Public Utility Commissioners (PUC) to Jersey Central Power & Light Company in 1966, with occasional freight service still being utilized through the Freehold Industrial Track.

NJ Transit offers bus service between Englishtown and the Port Authority Bus Terminal in Midtown Manhattan, which is available on the 139 route.

Old Bridge Airport and Mar Bar L Farms municipal airport are within 2½ miles of Englishtown, offering short-distance flights to surrounding areas.

Points of interest
 Old Bridge Township Raceway Park

Notable people

People who were born in, residents of, or otherwise closely associated with Englishtown include:

 Robby Andrews (born 1991), middle-distance runner
 Deborah Berger (1956–2005), artist noted for her oeuvre of brightly colored textile works created in knitting and crochet
 Lou Brutus (born 1962), radio host, musician and photographer
 Dov Davidoff, stand-up comedian
 Ed Krawiec (born 1976), NHRA Pro Stock Motorcycle racer
 Abhimanyu Mishra (born 2009), chess grandmaster and prodigy

References

External links

 Borough of Englishtown official website
 Englishtown Fire Department
 Manalapan Englishtown Regional School District
 
 School Data for the Manalapan-Englishtown Regional School District, National Center for Education Statistics
 Colts Neck High School
 Freehold Regional High School District
 
 School Data for the Freehold Regional High School District, National Center for Education Statistics

 
1888 establishments in New Jersey
Borough form of New Jersey government
Boroughs in Monmouth County, New Jersey
Populated places established in 1888